Puka Ranra (Quechua puka red, ranra stony; stony ground, "red, stony ground", Hispanicized spelling Pucaranra) is a mountain in the Wansu mountain range  in the Andes of Peru, about  high. It is located in the Arequipa Region, La Unión Province, Puyca District. It is southwest of Qullpa K'uchu, Minasniyuq, Minata and Kunturillu. Puka Ranra lies in a remote, mountainous area north of Ikmaqucha.

References 

Mountains of Peru
Mountains of Arequipa Region